Piticocha (possibly from Quechua p'iti dividing by pulling powerfully to the extremes; gap, interruption, qucha lake, "gap lake") is a lake in Peru located in the Ancash Region, Pallasca Province, Cabana District.

See also
List of lakes in Peru

References

Lakes of Peru
Lakes of Ancash Region